Nuclear Drive may refer to:

 A song from the album Church of Hawkwind by Hawkwind
 Nuclear propulsion